Nowghan-e Sofla (also Romanized as Nowghān-e Soflá and Nowghān Sofla; also known as Nowghān-e Pā’īn) is a village in Karchambu-e Shomali Rural District, in the Central District of Buin va Miandasht County, Isfahan Province, Iran. At the 2006 census, its population was 217, in 51 families.

References 

Populated places in Buin va Miandasht County